The Lounge was a New Zealand Television talkback show hosted by Katie Kouloubrakis and filmed in Christchurch. The show was broadcast on Cue TV/Sky 110 and could also be viewed online on Freeview and the show's website. The show had been running since 3 September 2007. The show's broadcaster, Cue TV, became defunct on 31 May 2015. 

The show featured a variety of interviews and segments with topics such as gardening, cooking, fashion, interior design and theatre in New Zealand.

References

External links
 Official Lounge TV website
 Freeview site
 Cue TV site

New Zealand television talk shows
Cue TV original programming